Four Phantoms is the second studio album by Seattle-based doom metal band Bell Witch. It was released on April 28, 2015, through Profound Lore Records.

Critical reception

Four Phantoms was met with positive reviews. Pitchfork writer Grayson Haver Currin said "Due in part to the band’s slim configuration, Four Phantoms feels sculpted, each part perfectly visible and framed." Writing for Consequence of Sound, Sean Barry said "Four Phantoms leaves a lasting impression down deep in your psyche. For those of us who have never experienced an encounter with the paranormal, this album has got to be the next best thing." Vanessa Salvia of Invisible Oranges wrote, "The songs get shorter as the album progresses, and though they don’t become more sonically dense, they do become more emotionally devastating." Chronicles of Chaos' Dan Lake wrote, "Bell Witch's second full-length improves on all the promising elements of their 2012 album, Longing. It's slow (check) and crushing (check), but it rises above the crowd of similar mourners by employing some extraordinary tear-wringing guitar leads and pairing simple, plaintive singing with those cavernous extreme vocals."

Four Phantoms also appeared on several year-end lists.

Accolades

Track listing

Personnel
Credits adapted from liner notes.

Bell Witch
 Dylan Desmond – vocals, bass
 Adrian Guerra – percussion, vocals

Additional personnel
 Billy Anderson – production, engineering, mixing
 Brad Boatright – mastering
 Erik Moggridge – additional vocals (track 3)
 Justin Weis – mastering
 Paolo Girardi – artwork

References

2015 albums
Bell Witch (band) albums
Doom metal songs
Albums produced by Billy Anderson (producer)